Jump, made by Kyung-Hoon Kim, is a Korean comedic theatrical performance involving martial arts, acrobatics, and dance moves. The musical " Jump, " which was first performed in 2003, has recorded more than 7,000 performances and more than 3 million tickets was sold. More than 70 percent of domestic < Jump > visitors are foreigners. It also has a private theater in Seoul, South Korea

Plot
The plot involves a Korean family in Seoul preparing for a suitor for the daughter's hand.  The family's efforts are at first frustrated by a drunken uncle and then by two bungling burglars.  The suitor is a meek young man except when his glasses are removed. Thereupon, he is transformed into a martial arts power-house.

Performances
"JUMP" is the most famous comic martial art performance in Korea. The production company is Yegam Productions. Jumplasts about one hundred minutes. Besides performances in South Korea, Jump has been performed at various venues and places around the world, including
HomePage : www.hijump.co.kr
2005 Edinburgh Fringe Festival (where it garnered the top box office award)
London
New York City
Bangkok
South Africa
2015 India (Korean Festival Delhi)
2016 Hongkong
2016 Japan
2016 Indonesia
2016 2017 Taiwan
2017 Naples
2017 Madrid
2017 Sweden
2017 Singapore

Cast
The cast has included (in South Korea): Grandfather, Father, Mother, Daughter, Uncle, Son-in-low, Thief 1, Thief 2, Old Man.

References

External links
 Reservation Jump website
SNS_Facebook Jump website
SNS_Weibo Jump website

South Korean musicals
Musical comedy plays
Physical theatre